Kinmuck Castle was a 14th-century castle, about  north-east of Ellon, Aberdeenshire, Scotland, at, or close to, Mains of Kinmuck.
Alternative names are Castle of Kinmuck, Carmuck Castle and Kermuck Castle.

History
In 1413 the castle belonged to Thomas Kennedy, Constable of Aberdeen, who dismantled it then to build the old Ellon Castle.

Structure
The ditch was filled in 1867.

See also
Castles in Great Britain and Ireland
List of castles in Scotland

References

Castles in Aberdeenshire